American sludge metal band Eyehategod has released ten albums since 1989, in addition to EPs and singles. The band also appears on several compilations and has made two music videos.

Discography

Albums

Singles and EPs

The band also appears on several compilations, namely the Gummo soundtrack, Cry Now, Cry Later series of 7-inches, and appear on the Melvins tribute album We Reach: The Music of the Melvins covering "Easy as It Was".

DVDs

Singles and music videos
Anxiety Hangover (1996)
Age of Bootcamp (2002)
Southern Discomfort (2008)
Medicine Noose (2014)

Discographies of American artists
Heavy metal group discographies